"Straight Lines" is a song by Australian rock band Silverchair. It was released on 12 March 2007 and debuted at number one on the Australian ARIA Singles Chart, becoming the band's first number-one single since 1997's "Freak". The single was shortly followed by the release of the band's fifth studio album Young Modern on 31 March 2007. Unlike the songs written during Diorama, when Daniel Johns wrote all the tracks himself, "Straight Lines" was co-written by the Presets' Julian Hamilton.

On 2 September 2007, "Straight Lines" was accredited double platinum by ARIA, representing combined digital sales and physical shipment of 140,000 singles in Australia, equalling "Tomorrow" as their best selling single. On 28 October 2007, "Straight Lines" won "Best Selling Australian Single" at the ARIA Music Awards of 2007, as well as "Single of the Year". The song was the most played song on Australian radio in 2007. It charted at number two on the Triple J Hottest 100 for 2007 and missed out on the number-one spot by only 13 votes.

In January 2018, as part of Triple M's "Ozzest 100", the 'most Australian' songs of all time, "Straight Lines" was ranked number 74.

Song meaning

"Straight Lines" is generally a positive and upbeat song. The song is about feeling alone in the world, but making it through tough times and overcoming them. This is illustrated in the lyrics such as "Lately I'm a desperate believer, but I'm walking in a straight line" and "There's no changing yesterday...everything will be fine". Another interpretation is that of recovery from addiction. The song's meaning appears to be a biographical comment from lead singer Daniel Johns, who fought anorexia, clinical depression and reactive arthritis in the late nineties and early millennium, and was able to beat them. It also appears to be about being content with your place in life, thus walking in a straight line. As demonstrated in research into recuperation from addiction, mental illness and chronic pain, this can also mean a contraction of existence to a narrow path of routine as a coping mechanism. Some have interpreted the 'become a desperate believer' lyric as reflecting the disconcerting innate religiosity of 12-step paradigms of behavioural and chemical addiction.

Music video
Footage for the video, which fans were invited to appear in, was shot in Sydney. The music video for the single appeared on the official website and released to radio on 2 February 2007. The video for the song also premiered on the day. It features a dynamic band performance that was filmed at the Olympic Park railway station, Sydney by directors Paul Goldman and Alice Bell (the pair behind the acclaimed film Suburban Mayhem). The video was awarded "Best Video" at the 2007 ARIA Awards and was a Contender for Best Rock Video at the 2008 MTV Video Music Awards.

Awards and nominations

APRA Award
2008 Song of the Year and Most Played Australian Work APRA Awards for "Straight Lines", written by Daniel Johns and Julian Hamilton, was presented by Australasian Performing Right Association.

Track listing
Australian maxi-CD single 
 "Straight Lines"
 "All Across the World"
 "Sleep All Day" (demo)
 "Don't Wanna Be the One" (live)

Credits and personnel
Credits are taken from the Australian maxi-CD single liner notes.

Studios
 Recorded at Seedy Underbelly Studio (Los Angeles, California, US)
 Additional recording at the Panic Room (Sydney, Australia)
 Mixed at Metalworks Recording Studios (Mississauga, Ontario, Canada)
 Mastered at Gateway Mastering (Portland, Maine, US)

Personnel

 Daniel Johns – lyrics, music, production, additional recording
 Julian Hamilton – music
 Nick Launay – production, recording
 Scott Horscroft – production assistance
 Paul Mac – production assistance, additional recording
 David Bottrill – mixing
 Giancarlo Gallo – mixing assistance
 Bob Ludwig – mastering
 Hackett Films – artwork

Charts

Weekly charts

Year-end charts

Decade-end charts

Certifications

See also
List of number-one singles in Australia in 2007

References

2007 singles
2007 songs
ARIA Award-winning songs
Eleven: A Music Company singles
Number-one singles in Australia
Silverchair songs
Song recordings produced by Nick Launay
Songs written by Daniel Johns
Songs written by Julian Hamilton